Christine Zander is an American television writer and producer. She started writing for national television on NBC's Saturday Night Live (1986–1993).

Personal life 
Zander is the daughter of Marie Zander, who died in May 2001. She has one brother Ernie Zander.  She married actor and writer Mark Nutter in 1987, and together they had son Andrew Nutter. Nutter and Zander first met at the cabaret Cross-Currents in Chicago where they were both performing improvisational comedy, and Nutter also played keyboard for the Second City touring company. The couple relocated from Chicago to New York City when Zander was offered a position at Saturday Night Live in 1986. After seven years of working for Saturday Night Live, Mark Nutter and Zander relocated with their baby to Los Angeles for Nutter to find more opportunities as a writer. They have since divorced. She is in a relationship with the German comedian Dieter Hallervorden.

Career

Saturday Night Live 

Christine Zander joined the 1986 season of Saturday Night Live along with other famous comedy writers such as Kevin Nealon and Phil Hartman. The first sketch Zander was able to get on the air starred Bill Murray as the  one night stand of cast member Jan Hooks.  During her time there, she worked closely with Nora Dunn on various sketches. When Dunn left the show, she became very close with Julia Sweeney, helping her craft sketches for the famous character “Pat,” an androgynous and cripplingly awkward boss.  Zander and Sweeney later collaborated on a fictional biography for the character, It’s Pat! My Life Exposed, which was published by Hyperion in September 1992. Her favorite sketches to write on the show were “Pat,” “Attitudes” starring John Malcovich, and “Their Eyes Evolved to Be on Their Breasts,” which involved women who developed eyes on their breasts so as to better meet the male gaze.

When Christine Z. joined the staff of Saturday Night Live, she and Rosie Shuster were the only two females on the writing staff. In 1992 Zander told the New York Times, “If you don't have a lot of women to bounce ideas off or back you up it can get a little crazy around here. None of the men are individually sexist; it's just hard for them to have faith in something from a woman's point of view.

3rd Rock from the Sun 
Zander was thrilled to join her writer friends from SNL Bonnie and Terry Turner who created the NBC sitcom 3rd Rock from the Sun in 1996.  The sitcom followed a group of extraterrestrials sent to Earth to investigate human society, and it starred famous actors John Lithgow and Joseph Gordon-Levitt. The show was fairly popular; its ratings ranked 22nd in the 1995 television season and 27th in the 1996 season. Zander eventually became executive producer of the series in 1999 until the show’s end in 2001.

Filmography

As writer

As producer

References

External links 

Date of birth missing (living people)
Living people
American television writers
American television producers
American women television producers
American women television writers
Year of birth missing (living people)
21st-century American women